The 1968 County Championship was the 69th officially organised running of the County Championship. Yorkshire won their third consecutive Championship title.

The method of obtaining points changed again for a third successive year:

 10 points for a win
 5 points for a tie
 5 points for a team batting last in a drawn match with scores level
 1 bonus point for every 25 runs over 150 and for every 2 wickets taken (in the first 85 overs only).
 10 points for a win but no bonus points if less than 8 hours remain at the start of a match

Table

References

1968 in English cricket
County Championship seasons